The 4000 series is a CMOS logic family of integrated circuits (ICs) first introduced in 1968 by RCA. It was slowly migrated into the 4000B buffered series after about 1975. It had a much wider supply voltage range than any contemporary logic family (3V to 18V recommended range for "B" series). Almost all IC manufacturers active during this initial era fabricated models for this series. Its naming convention is still in use today.

History

The 4000 series was introduced as the CD4000 COS/MOS series in 1968 by RCA as a lower power and more versatile alternative to the 7400 series of transistor-transistor logic (TTL) chips. The logic functions were implemented with the newly introduced Complementary Metal–Oxide–Semiconductor (CMOS) technology. While initially marketed with "COS/MOS" labeling by RCA (which stood for Complementary Symmetry Metal-Oxide Semiconductor), the shorter CMOS terminology emerged as the industry preference to refer to the technology. The first chips in the series were designed by a group led by Albert Medwin.

Wide adoption was initially hindered by the comparatively lower speeds of the designs compared to TTL based designs. Speed limitations were eventually overcome with newer fabrication methods (such as self aligned gates of polysilicon instead of metal). These CMOS variants performed on par with contemporary TTL. The series was extended in the late 1970s and 1980s with new models that were given 45xx and 45xxx designations, but are usually still regarded by engineers as part of the 4000 series. In the 1990s, some manufacturers (e.g. Texas Instruments) ported the 4000 series to newer HCMOS based designs to provide greater speeds.

Design considerations
The 4000 series facilitates simpler circuit design through relatively low power consumption, a wide range of supply voltages, and vastly increased load-driving capability (fanout) compared to TTL. This makes the series ideal for use in prototyping LSI designs. While TTL ICs are similarly modular, these usually lack the symmetrical drive strength of CMOS and may therefore require more consideration of the loads applied on its outputs.
Just like with TTL, buffered models can drive higher electrical current (mainly available for I/O-devices like octal latches and three-state drivers) but have a slightly higher risk of introducing ringing (transient oscillations) unless correctly damped or terminated. Many models contain a high level of integration, including fully integrated 7-segment display counters, walking ring counters, and full adders.

Common chips

Logic gates

Flip-flops
 4013 – Dual D-type flip-flop. Each flip-flop has independent data, Q, /Q, clock, reset, set.
 40174 – Hex D-type flip-flop. Each flip-flop has independent data and Q. All share clock and reset.
 40175 – Quad D-type flip-flop. Each flip-flop has independent data, Q, /Q. All share clock and reset.

Counters
 4017 – Decade counter with 10-output decoder.
 4026 – Decade counter with 7-segment digit decoded output.
 40110 – Up/down decade counter with 7-segment display decoder with 25 mA output drivers.
 40192 – Up/down decade counter with 4-bit BCD preset.
 40193 – Up/down binary counter with 4-bit binary preset.

Decoders
 4028 – 4-bit BCD to 10-output decoder (can be used as 3-bit binary to 8-output decoder)
 4511 – 4-bit BCD to 7-segment display decoder with 25 mA output drivers.

Timers
 4047 – Monostable/astable multivibrator with external RC oscillator.
 4060 – 14-bit ripple counter with external RC or crystal oscillator (long duration) (schmitt-trigger inputs) (can be used with 32.768 kHz crystal)
 4541 – 16-bit ripple counter with external RC oscillator (long duration).

Analog
 4051 – Single 8-channel analog mux.
 4066 – Quad SPST analog switch.

See also
 LVCMOS
 7400-series integrated circuits
 List of 7400-series integrated circuits
 Logic family
 Logic gate
 Programmable logic device
 Pin compatibility

References

Further reading

Periodicals
 New low-voltage COS/MOS IC's (CD4000A); RCA Engineer; Vol 17 No 1; June 1971 to July 1971; Pages 40–45.
 15 articles about COS/MOS IC's; RCA Engineer; Vol 18 No 4; December 1972 to January 1973.

Books
 CMOS Cookbook; 4th Ed; Don Lancaster, Howard Berlin; Elsevier; 512 pages; 2019; . (archive)
 CMOS Sourcebook; 1st Ed; Newton Braga; Prompt Press; 390 pages; 2001; .
 Understanding CMOS Integrated Circuits; 2nd Ed; Roger Melen and Harry Garland; Sams Publishing; 144 pages; 1979; . (archive)
 Second Book of CMOS IC Projects; 1st Ed; R.A. Penfold; Bernard Babani Publishing; 127 pages; 1979; . (archive)
 50 CMOS IC Projects; 1st Ed; R.A. Penfold; Bernards Publishing; 112 pages; 1977; . (archive)

Historical Documents
 Signetics HE4000B Family Specifications; IC04; 13 pages; 1995.
 RCA COS/MOS IC Manual; CMS-272; 170 pages; 1979.
 RCA COS/MOS IC Manual; CMS-270; TBD pages; 1971.

Historical Databooks
 RCA CMOS Databook; SSD-250C; 798 pages; 1983.
 RCA COS/MOS Databook; SSD-203C; 649 pages; 1975.
 Motorola CMOS Databook; DL131; 560 pages; 1988.
 National CMOS Databook; 930 pages; 1981.
 ST HCC40xxx Rad-Hard Logic Family; 16 pages; 2020. (meant for hi-rel & space use)

External links

 Understanding 4000-series digital logic ICs – Nuts and Volts magazine
 Thorough list of 4000-series ICs – Electronics Club
 4000-series logic and analog circuitry – Analog Devices

Digital electronics
Integrated circuits